Yohanna Logan (born January 15, 1975) is an American fashion designer.

She was born in upstate New York. Later, she moved to Manhattan and then Los Angeles to become a successful clothing designer and lead singer of the band Wow! Cougar, an electro-rock band.

Her clothing label is named Shawn, which is also her nickname. The label is popular with bands such as Green Day, No Doubt, Red Hot Chili Peppers, and P.J. Harvey.

She is the ex-girlfriend of Anthony Kiedis (front-man of Red Hot Chili Peppers); they had an on-off relationship ranging from 1998 to 2003. In the original printings of Anthony Kiedis's autobiography Scar Tissue, she is referred to by her real name. However, in reprints she is referred to as "Claire Essex". Kiedis documented their relationship in songs from the Chili Peppers Californication era such as "Fat Dance" while their breakup served as a major influence on his writing for 2002's By the Way.

References

 Official Shawn Clothing Website

American fashion designers
American women fashion designers
1975 births
Living people
21st-century American singers
21st-century American women singers